A chopine is a type of women's platform shoe that was popular in the 15th, 16th and 17th centuries. Chopines were originally used as a patten, clog, or overshoe to protect the shoes and dress from mud and street soil.  

Chopines were popularly worn in Venice by both courtesans and patrician women from c. 1400 to 1700. Besides their practical uses, the height of the chopine became a symbolic reference to the cultural and social standing of the wearer; the higher the chopine, the higher the status of the wearer. High chopines allowed a woman to tower over others. In 1430, the height of chopines was limited by Venetian law to three inches, but this regulation was widely ignored. Shakespeare joked about the extreme height of the chopines in style in his day by using the word altitude (Hamlet 2.2, the prince greets one of the visiting players – the adolescent boy who would have played the female parts in the all-male troupe – by noting how much "nearer to heaven" the lad had grown since he last saw him "by the altitude of a chopine").

Surviving chopines are typically made of wood or cork, and those in the Spanish style were sometimes banded about with metal. Extant pieces are covered with leather, brocades, or jewel-embroidered velvet. Often, the fabric of the chopine matched the dress or the shoe, but not always. However, despite being highly decorated, chopines were often hidden under the wearer's skirt and were hidden from any critical observation. Although due to the design of the shoes, they caused the wearer to have a very "comical walk".

According to some scholars, chopines caused an unstable and inelegant gait. Noblewomen wearing them were generally accompanied by two servants in order to walk around safely, by supporting themselves on the servants' shoulders. Other scholars have argued that with practice a woman could walk and even dance gracefully. In his dancing manual Nobilità di dame (1600), the Italian dancing master Fabritio Caroso writes that with care a woman practiced in wearing her chopines could move “with grace, seemliness, and beauty” and even "dance flourishes and galliard variations". Chopines were usually put on with the help of two servants.

In the 15th century, chopines were also the style in Spain. Their popularity in Spain was so great that the larger part of the nation's cork supplies went towards production of the shoes. Some argue that the style originated in Spain, as there are many extant examples and a great amount of pictorial and written reference going back to the 14th century. Chopines of the Spanish style were more often conical and symmetric, while their Venetian counterparts are much more artistically carved. Turkish sources claim the origin of the ornate Venetian chopines were nalins developed for turkish baths.  That is not to say, however, that Spanish chopines were not adorned; on the contrary, there is evidence of jeweling, gilt lettering along the surround (the material covering the cork or wooden base), tooling, and embroidery on Spanish chopines. 

There are a great many cognates of the word chopine (chapiney, choppins, etc.). However, neither the word chopine nor any word similar to it (etc.) appears in Florio's dictionaries of either 1598 or 1611. The Italian word, instead, seems to be "" (English plural: clogs), which likely comes from the Italian word "", meaning a stump or a block of wood. Florio does, however, use the word "chopinos" in his English definition of zoccoli.

See also 
 Geta (footwear)
 Chopine, volume

References

External links 

 http://www.aands.org/raisedheels
 http://www.chass.utoronto.ca/~ebernhar/index.shtml 
 http://www.metmuseum.org/toah/ho/08/eustn/hod_1973.114.4a,b.htm

Historical footwear
Medieval European costume
Shoes